South Staffordshire is a constituency represented in the House of Commons of the UK Parliament since 2010 by Sir Gavin Williamson, a Conservative.

Boundaries 

1832–1868: The Hundreds of South Offlow, Seisdon and Cuttleston.

1983–1997: The District of South Staffordshire.

1997–2010: The District of South Staffordshire wards of Bilbrook, Brewood and Coven, Cheslyn Hay, Codsall North, Codsall South, Essington, Featherstone, Great Wyrley Landywood, Great Wyrley Town, Kinver, Lower Penn, Pattingham and Patshull, Perton Central, Perton Dippons, Shareshill, Swindon, Trysull and Seisdon, Wombourne North, Wombourne South East, and Wombourne South West.

2010–present: The District of South Staffordshire wards of Bilbrook, Brewood and Coven, Cheslyn Hay North and Saredon, Cheslyn Hay South, Codsall North, Codsall South, Essington, Featherstone and Shareshill, Great Wyrley Landywood, Great Wyrley Town, Himley and Swindon, Huntington and Hatherton, Kinver, Pattingham and Patshull, Perton Dippons, Perton East, Perton Lakeside, Trysull and Seisdon, Wombourne North and Lower Penn, Wombourne South East, and Wombourne South West.

The constituency is made up of about two-thirds of the South Staffordshire local government district, its southern bulk. It flanks the western edge of the West Midlands, the closest parts being Wolverhampton and Dudley and it does not contain any large towns; the largest town (by electorate) is Wombourne. Its settlements include Brewood, Cheslyn Hay, Codsall, Featherstone, Great Wyrley, Kinver, Perton and Wombourne.  Most electoral wards have to date been locally Conservative safe seats with Labour's only area of frequent strength, Cheslyn Hay, a town with historically a greater dependence on coal mining than the others.

History

1832–1868
The ancient county constituency of Staffordshire was divided under the Reform Act 1832 into two two-member constituencies, while other parts of the old constituency were made into or added to borough constituencies.  These halves were formally the Northern division of Staffordshire and the Southern division of Staffordshire with less formal variations more common. The Reform Act 1867 abolished the Southern Division with effect from the 1868 general election, replacing it with two new two-seat constituencies: East Staffordshire and West Staffordshire.

Prominent figures
Edward Littleton was involved heavily in Catholic Emancipation, the Truck Act of 1831, the Parliamentary Boundaries Act 1832 and the Municipal Corporations Act 1835. For two years he was Chief Secretary for Ireland, prominent in the governments led by Melbourne.

Henry Chetwynd-Talbot (later The Earl of Shrewsbury) became an Admiral and whip in the House of Lords in later in life. In most of this early period the constituency elected prominent land-owning industrialists, including, for example, in Walsall, and Wolverhampton. Henry Hodgetts-Foley inherited the majority of Penkridge, now in the Stafford seat, much developed by his heirs.

1983–present

The present South Staffordshire constituency was established in 1983, although in reality this was merely a renaming of the Staffordshire South West constituency formed in 1974 from parts of the former constituencies of Brierley Hill and Cannock.  It covered the whole of the South Staffordshire district until 1997, when the area around Penkridge was included in the Stafford constituency.

It has to date been a safe seat for the Conservative Party, with Sir Patrick Cormack having held it from its creation in 1974 until he retired in 2010, when he was succeeded by Sir Gavin Williamson. Williamson has held many offices, including Parliamentary Private Secretary to the Prime Minister from 2013 until 2016, Chief Whip of the House of Commons from 2016 until 2017, Defence Secretary from 2017 to 2019, and Education Secretary from 2019 until his return to the backbenches in 2021.

General election 2005 

On 30 April 2005, the Liberal Democrat candidate Josephine Harrison died of an undisclosed illness at the age of 53.  Election procedures at the time required that in the event of a candidate's death after the close of nominations, the returning officer had to direct the general election poll (due to be held on 5 May) to be abandoned, and to call a fresh general election poll.  This was duly done under the same writ of election, 28 days after having seen proof of death.  As the poll was not strictly a by-election, but rather a part of the general election, it was run under general election regulations; for instance, not qualifying for the significantly higher election expenses available at by-elections.

The original candidates were:
 Penny Barber, Labour
 Sir Patrick Cormack, Conservative
 Adrian Davies. Freedom Party
 Josephine Harrison, Liberal Democrats
 Malcolm Hurst, United Kingdom Independence Party

On 9 May, the Labour candidate, Penny Barber, announced that she was standing down as she could not afford to take any more time off work. The constituency Labour Party had to select a new candidate, choosing Paul Kalinauckas who had been their candidate in the 2001 election.  The Liberal Democrats selected Jo Crotty as their replacement candidate.  In addition, three additional candidates who had not been nominated for the original poll fought the delayed election: Kate Spohrer of the Green Party, Rev. David Braid of Clause 28 Children's Protection Christian Democrats, and most notably the journalist Garry Bushell representing the English Democrats Party, who had already stood in the Greenwich and Woolwich constituency on 5 May, where he had polled 3.4%.

The election was eventually held on 23 June 2005 and saw Sir Patrick Cormack hold the seat.  With the seat being safely Conservative, and with the results of the general election in other constituencies already known, the election attracted a considerably lower turnout (37.3%) than in other constituencies (akin to a by-election).  Cormack increased his majority to 34.5% (a 9.1% swing), while the United Kingdom Independence Party saw one of their best results of 2005, with 10.4% of the vote.

A year later the Electoral Administration Act 2006 was passed, in part because of the events in South Staffordshire. Under the new rules, in case of the death of a candidate, the party of the deceased candidate is allowed to select a replacement candidate. New nominations from parties which did not contest the original pool are no longer permitted. This rule was first used in the 2010 general election when the UKIP candidate for Thirsk and Malton died before the election.

Constituency profile
A Guardian statistical compilation by constituency in November 2012 showed that 2.8% of the population only were registered jobseekers, significantly lower than the national average of 3.8%.

Members of Parliament

MPs 1832–1868

MPs since 1983

Elections

Elections in the 2010s 

The vote share change in 2010 comes from the notional, not actual, results because of boundary changes.

Elections in the 2000s 

Note the South Staffordshire 2005 Parliamentary election was postponed until 23 June due to the death of a candidate.

Elections in the 1990s

Elections in the 1980s

Elections in the 1860s

Elections in the 1850s

 Caused by Legge's succession to the peerage, becoming 5th Earl of Dartmouth.

 Caused by Anson's resignation.

Elections in the 1840s

 Caused by Chetwynd-Talbot's succession to the peerage, becoming 18th Earl of Shrewsbury

 Caused by Anson's appointment as Clerk of the Ordnance

Elections in the 1830s

 Caused by Littleton's elevation to the peerage, becoming 1st Baron Hatherton

 Caused by Littleton's appointment as Chief Secretary to the Lord Lieutenant of Ireland

See also
List of parliamentary constituencies in Staffordshire

Notes

References

External links 
 Lib Dems announce candidate death, BBC News
 Labour's search for new candidate, BBC News
The Guardian: Election begins in the seat time forgot

Parliamentary constituencies in Staffordshire
South Staffordshire District
Constituencies of the Parliament of the United Kingdom established in 1832
Constituencies of the Parliament of the United Kingdom disestablished in 1868
Constituencies of the Parliament of the United Kingdom established in 1983